The 1980 New Mexico Lobos football team was an American football team that represented the University of New Mexico in the Western Athletic Conference (WAC) during the 1980 NCAA Division I-A football season.  In their first season under head coach Joe Morrison, the Lobos compiled a 4–7 record (3–4 against WAC opponents) and were outscored by a total of 364 to 246. 

The first game of the season proved to be most notable victory for the team, as the Lobos upset BYU, 25-21.  The Jim McMahon-led Cougars went undefeated the rest of the season, finishing with a 12-1 record and #12 national ranking in the final Associated Press poll. 

The team's statistical leaders included Robin Gabriel with 1,083 passing yards, Jimmy Sayers with 691 rushing yards, Ricky Martin with 850 receiving yards, and kicker Pete Parks with 58 points scored.

Schedule

References

New Mexico
New Mexico Lobos football seasons
New Mexico Lobos football